The Philippine House Committee on Natural Resources, or House Natural Resources Committee is a standing committee of the Philippine House of Representatives.

Jurisdiction 
As prescribed by House Rules, the committee's jurisdiction is on natural resources, except energy and fisheries resources, which includes the following:
 Exploration, conservation, management and utilization
 Forests, parks and wildlife
 Lands of the public domain
 Marine resources
 Mines and minerals

Members, 18th Congress

Historical members

18th Congress

Vice Chairpersons 
 Marissa Andaya (Camarines Sur–1st, NPC)
 Nestor Fongwan (Benguet–Lone, PDP–Laban)

See also
 House of Representatives of the Philippines
 List of Philippine House of Representatives committees
 Department of Environment and Natural Resources

Notes

References

External links 
House of Representatives of the Philippines

Natural